The coat of arms of the British Antarctic Territory was first granted in 1952, when the territory was still a dependency of the Falkland Islands (along with South Georgia and the South Sandwich Islands).

The arms consist of a shield bearing a flaming torch on a wavy background representing the sea. The dexter supporter is a golden lion, representing the United Kingdom. The sinister supporter is an Emperor penguin, representing the native wildlife in the territory. The lion stands on a compartment of grass, while the penguin stands on a compartment of ice. The crest is a representation of the RRS Discovery, the research ship used by Robert Falcon Scott and Ernest Shackleton on their first journey to the Antarctic.

The motto is “Research and Discovery”, reflecting the aims of the British Antarctic Survey.

The coat of arms appears in the fly of the flag of the British Antarctic Territory.

Official description
The official blazon granted by the British College of Arms is as follows:

Arms: Per Fesse wavy barry wavy of six Argent and Azure and Argent on a Pile Gules a Torch enflamed proper.

Supporters: On the dexter side a Lion Or and on the sinister side an Emperor Penguin proper.

Motto: Research and Discovery

See also
 List of coats of arms of the United Kingdom and dependencies
 Coat of arms of the Falkland Islands

References

British Overseas Territories coats of arms
National coats of arms
British Antarctic Territory
British Antarctic Territory
British Antarctic Territory
British Antarctic Territory
British Antarctic Territory
British Antarctic Territory